Seyyed Ziba Mohammad (also Romanized as Seyyed Zībā Moḩammad and Saiyid Zeiha Muhammad; also known as Qaryeh Zībā Moḩammad and Zībā Moḩammad) is a village in Azna Rural District, in the Central District of Khorramabad County, Lorestan Province, Iran. At the 2006 census, its population was 211, in 41 families.

References 

Towns and villages in Khorramabad County